Caldwell station was the fourth of six stations on the Erie Railroad Caldwell Branch, located in Caldwell, New Jersey. The station was located on Bloomfield Avenue (County Route 506) just north-east of Caldwell College (now Caldwell University). The station opened in 1891 as the terminus of the Caldwell Railroad, a branch of the New York and Greenwood Lake Railroad that forked off at Great Notch station in Little Falls, Passaic County.

Caldwell station was one of two stations in the borough, the other being located at the Monomonock Inn, a local hotel that closed in 1940. Service was extended in 1891 to nearby Essex Fells. The original station in Caldwell, built in June 1891, was moved by horse to nearby Verona station in 1905 after the latter burned down. The railroad used 12 horses to get the depot, which was serving as a freight depot, down to Verona.

Caldwell station existed through the end of service on the Caldwell Branch, when the Erie-Lackawanna Railroad discontinued service on September 30, 1966. The borough had the station demolished a year prior on August 6, 1965.

History 
Caldwell station opened with the construction of the Caldwell Branch of the New York and Greenwood Lake Railroad (a subsidiary of the Erie Railroad system). The original proposed service through Caldwell was the Caldwell Railroad, a company founded in March 1869 for the construction of a railroad between Montclair and Caldwell. Construction began in 1872 of the railroad. However, work on this route was suspended in 1872 due to the inability to complete a tunnel through Montclair and nearby Verona. About  of the tunnel was left uncompleted.

The railroad was built in 1891, with the route via Great Notch station in Little Falls. Service on the railroad began on July 4, 1891. Service, one year later, was extended to nearby Essex Fells. 

The station was replaced in 1904 as part of the construction of the Morristown and Caldwell Railroad. Construction of this new station cost the Erie Railroad $20,000 (1904 USD). The new station would do the work of the Erie Railroad and the Morristown and Caldwell Railroad. On July 4, 1904, thirteen years after the commencement of service through Caldwell, the first train of the Morristown and Caldwell crossed through the borough. The old station, built in 1891, was moved across the tracks, serving as a freight house.

On January 9, 1905, the passenger station built at the nearby Verona station caught fire. The depot, along with its contents, were burned and lost. The Erie Railroad decided to take the old station at Caldwell, serving as a freight depot, to become the new passenger depot at Verona. In February 1905, the snow-covered ground served as an opportunity to move the depot. With 12 horses, the old freight depot was moved up Bloomfield Avenue on rafters to Depot Street and Personette Street. This depot burned down in the winter of 1962.

In July 1907, commuters were confused when they came to Caldwell station and found the doors locked. Henry Banta, the newly-appointed station agent, had left town and locked the station without telling anyone. When an employee from Pavonia Terminal came to Caldwell to open the station, they found everything in good condition with all books and details in place. Banta, like his predecessor, John I. Jacobus, is believed to have left due to the incredible amount of work it was taking with no assistant.

In 1902, the Monomonock Inn, a local hotel and resort, opened on the east side of Prospect St, between Bloomfield Ave and Academy Rd. This helped influence the growth of Caldwell, to the extent that by 1916, the inn itself had its own station on the Caldwell Branch. The Inn was closed and razed in 1940, to be replaced by local housing and an A&P grocery store. Local streetcar service, which ran next to the Caldwell station on Bloomfield Avenue ended in 1952.

The borough of Caldwell purchased the depot in 1965 from the cash-strapped Erie Lackawanna Railroad.  (The Erie Railroad and the Delaware, Lackawanna and Western Railroad had merged on October 17, 1960, as they were both struggling financially.) The borough razed the depot on August 6, 1965. Service at Caldwell station ended on September 30, 1966, when multiple branch lines of the Erie Lackawanna were discontinued.

References

Bibliography

External links
Caldwell Photos - First Baptist Church of Bloomfield

Railway stations in the United States opened in 1891
Caldwell
Railway stations in Essex County, New Jersey
Infrastructure completed in 1891
1891 establishments in New Jersey
Caldwell, New Jersey
Former railway stations in New Jersey
Railway stations closed in 1966
1966 disestablishments in New Jersey